Ellarum Innattu Mannar is a 1960 Indian Tamil language film directed by T. Prakash Rao. The film stars Gemini Ganesan and B. Saroja Devi, with M. N. Nambiar, M. N. Rajam and K. A. Thangavelu in supporting roles.

Plot 
Valiyan Kodu is a Kingdom ruled by Suhadevar. His daughter is Kanchana. The king is a sickly person. Divan Alavandhar administers the State. He has two sons. Veeramani is his own son and Thirumeni is his adopted son. Divan plans to Veeramani to marry Kanchana and become the ruler of Valiyan Kodu.
Valluvan Kundram is a village adjacent but outside the Kingdom. People of Valluvan Kundram consider Thangadurai as their chief. He is a patriotic person working for the welfare of the village. He has a younger brother named Thambidurai. They both had a sister named Angayarkanni. Thangadurai's wife is Idhyarani. The Head of the family is Chelliah, an uncle of Thangadurai.
A conflict begins between Valiyan Kodu and Valluvan Kundram when a statue of Tiruvalluvar is found when the people of Valluvan Kundram builds a dam. The divan of Valiyan Kodu claims the statue. Thambidurai keeps the statue in a well-guarded cave in Valluvan Kundram. Thirumeni comes to Valluvan Kundram for spying. He falls in love with Angayarkanni. Thambidurai meets Kanchana when she her father, the King spends a holiday in a forest resort. Thambidurai and Kanchana falls in love with each other. In the meantime, it becomes known that Tirumeni is the lost son of Chelliah.
The divan gets angry. He sends the King and Kanchana to Jail and declares war on Valluvan Kundram. How the Divan is exposed and the couples are united forms the rest of the story.

Cast 

 Gemini Ganesan as Thambidurai
 B. Saroja Devi as Princess Kanchana
 M. N. Nambiar as Thirumeni
 M. N. Rajam
 T. K. Bagavathi
 R. Nagendra Rao
 K. A. Thangavelu
 T. K. Ramachandran
 A. Karunanidhi
 M. R. Santhanam
 P. S. Venkitachalam
 S. G. Eswaran
 M. Krishnamurthi
 Lakshmiprabha
 P. Susheela

Soundtrack 
Music was composed by T. G. Lingappa and the lyrics were penned by Pattukottai Kalyanasundaram, Ku. Ma. Balasubramaniam, R. Pazhanichami and S. Rathinam.

References

External links 

1960s Tamil-language films
Films scored by T. G. Lingappa
Films with screenplays by M. Karunanidhi
Jupiter Pictures films